Dalum Idrætsforening is a Danish football club currently playing in the Danish 3rd Division, the fourth tier of the Danish divisions. They play at Dalum Stadion in southern parts of Odense on Funen, a stadium with a capacity of 4,000. Founded in 1931, the club rose to prominence in the late 1990s, playing two seasons in the second tier, Danish 1st Division and six seasons in the third tier Danish 2nd Division from 1998 to 2006,  and again from 2015–16.

Starting from the 2006–07 season, they merged with B 1909 and B 1913, with new team FC Fyn their combined first team. This club dissolved in 2013.

References

External links
Official site (in Danish)
Dalum IF at Danish Football Association

Association football clubs established in 1931
Football clubs in Denmark
Sport in Odense
1931 establishments in Denmark